WOYE is a radio station on 97.3 FM. Licensed to Rio Grande, WOYE serves San Juan, Puerto Rico and the entire metropolitan area. The station carries a mix of the 1980s, 1990s, and modern English music. WOYE brands itself as Magic and it is owned by Magic Radio Networks.

Logos

References

External links
Official Website of Magic 97.3

OYE
Radio stations established in 2003
Río Grande, Puerto Rico
2003 establishments in Puerto Rico
Adult hits radio stations